John Bowles may refer to:

Jack Bowles (1890–1971), English cricketer
John Bowles (author) (1751–1819), English barrister and author
John Bowles (darts player) (born 1967), English darts player
John Bowles (priest) (died 1558), Canon of Windsor
John Bowles (MP for New Shoreham), English politician of the 16th century
John Bowles (aka Johnny Bowles) (born 1965), Australian entertainer and member of Young Talent Time (1977–81)

See also
John Bowle (disambiguation)